Brussels Royal IHSC was an ice hockey team in Brussels, Belgium. The team played in the Belgian Hockey League.

History
The club was founded in 1909 as Brussels IHSC. They won the 1912 and 1913 Belgian championships.

They became Entente Saint-Sauveur de Bruxelles in 1948, and won the league title in 1951, before being renamed Brussels IHSC (their old name) in 1954, and won the title with that name in 1962.

The club was renamed Brussels IHSC Poseidon in 1966. In 1970, the team took on their final name, Brussels Royal IHSC, and won eight more league titles under this name.

Achievements
Belgian champion (23):  1912, 1913, 1923, 1938, 1940, 1941, 1942, 1943, 1944, 1945, 1947, 1948, 1951, 1962, 1968, 1970, 1971, 1975, 1976, 1977, 1978, 1980, 1982.

Notable players
 Luc Tardif

References

External links
Profile on hockeyarenas.net

Ice hockey teams in Belgium
Sport in Brussels
Ice hockey clubs established in 1909
1909 establishments in Belgium